Homopipramol is a tricyclic antidepressant and antipsychotic which was never marketed.

See also 
 Opipramol

References 

Primary alcohols
Dibenzazepines
Tricyclic antidepressants
Antipsychotics
Abandoned drugs
Diazepanes